Olofström Municipality is the only landlocked municipality in Blekinge County, South Sweden. It borders to Osby Municipality, Kristianstad Municipality, Bromölla Municipality, Sölvesborg Municipality, Karlshamn Municipality, Tingsryd Municipality, and Älmhult Municipality. The town of Olofström is the seat of the municipality.

The amalgamation of the former units in this area took place in 1967 when the market town Olofström (itself detached from Jämshög in 1941) was merged with Kyrkhult and Jämshög.

Notable person that Olofström counts as theirs is Nobel Prize winning author Harry Martinson (1904-1978; prize in 1974) who was born in Jämshög within the municipality.

Geography

The municipality is covered with forests and lakes. It labels itself "The southernmost wildlife in Sweden", probably because there are scarcely any forests or lakes south of the Blekinge province.

The highest point in the province and county of Blekinge, Rävabacken (189,65 m), is located in the northern part of the municipality.

Urban areas
There are 5 localities classified as urban areas (tätort in Swedish) in Olofström Municipality. In addition to that, there is one more recognized locality.

In the table the urban areas and localities are listed according to the size of the population as of December 31, 2006.  The municipal seat is in bold characters.

Parishes
Jämshög Parish
Kyrkhult Parish

Industry

The increased use of cars in the 1950s and 60's was the great boost for the municipality. Today the car industry, dominated by Volvo Cars, is the largest employer in Olofström with 2,400 employees, and some more working in other companies connected to this industry. The Volvo industry, with related production, is probably the main reason that the municipality's commuting surplus (as of 2005) is almost 2,000 a day, with many workers coming from the neighboring municipalities of a.o. Bromölla, Karlshamn and Sölvesborg.

Vilshult is a small village within the municipality, situated 10 km north of the central locality of Olofström. It is recognised for a photovoltaics (PV) modules factory that has been located there since 2001.

References

External links

Olofström - Official site
Tourism Olofström - International

 
Municipalities of Blekinge County